Siegfried Mehnert (born 3 March 1963 in Schenkenberg, Delitzsch, Bezirk Leipzig) is a former amateur boxer from East Germany. He is best known for twice winning the European title (1985 and 1989) in the men's welterweight (– 67 kg) division.  He also competed at the 1988 Seoul Olympics.

1988 Olympic results
Below is the Olympic record of Siegfried Mehnert, an East German welterweight boxer who competed at the 1988 Olympics in Seoul.

 Round of 64: defeated Jose Ortiz (Puerto Rico) by decision, 5–0
 Round of 32: defeated Abdellas Taouane (Morocco) by decision, 5–0
 Round of 16: lost to Song Kyung-Sup (South Korea) by decision, 2–3

References
sports-reference

1963 births
Living people
People from Delitzsch
People from Bezirk Leipzig
German male boxers
Welterweight boxers
Sportspeople from Saxony
Olympic boxers of East Germany
Boxers at the 1988 Summer Olympics
AIBA World Boxing Championships medalists
Recipients of the Patriotic Order of Merit in silver